The 2018 World Rowing Championships were the World Rowing Championships held at the regatta course in Plovdiv, Bulgaria. The event was held from 9 to 16 September. Events held were men and women's open class, lightweight class, and para-rowing.

Prior FISA regattas that had been held in Plovdiv include the 1999 and 2012 World Rowing Junior Championships, and the 2011 European Rowing Championships.

The 2018 World Rowing Championships were the first world rowing championships where the number of men’s and women’s events was equal. The world governing body made that decision in 2017.

Host selection
During 2013, Plovdiv and Sarasota, Florida both applied to host the 2017 World Rowing Championships. In April 2013, a committee of International Rowing Federation (FISA) officials visited the city in Florida and they went to Plovdiv the following month. It was then noted that Plovdiv had hosted the 2012 World Rowing Championships and that the bid documentation for 2017 had not been finalised. Before the next FISA congress, the bid from Plovdiv was changed to apply for the 2018 hosting rights. At the FISA congress held on 2 September 2013, hosting rights were assigned by unanimous decision for World Rowing Championships to Sarasota for 2017, Plovdiv for 2018, and Plovdiv for the 2015 World Rowing U23 Championships.

Medal summary

Rowing

Para rowing

Medal summary
 Non-Olympic/Paralympic classes

Men's events

Women's events

Para

Men

Women

Mixed para-rowing events

Event codes

References

External links
 Official website

 
World Rowing Championships
World Rowing Championships 2018
World Rowing Championships
World Rowing Championships 2018
2018 in Bulgarian sport
Sport in Plovdiv
September 2018 sports events in Europe